Chhatrish Ganda is a small village under Jamuria block of Asansol subdivision in Paschim Bardhaman district in the state of West Bengal, India. It is a suburb of Asansol.

Geography 
The village is near Pandaveswar surrounded by "Open Cast Coal Mines". It is located in Burdwan district, in the State of West Bengal, India. Chhatrish Ganda is located on the south bank of Ajay River. The Asansol-Durgapur region is composed of undulating laterite region. This area lies between two mighty rivers – the Damodar and the Ajay. They flow almost parallel to each other in the region. For ages the area was heavily forested and infested with plunderers and marauders. The discovery of coal led to industrialization of the area and most of the forests have been cleared.

Economy 
Chhatrish Ganda is situated in the heart of Raniganj Coalfield, one of India's coal mining areas.

Demographics 
As per 2011 census Chhatrish Ganda had a total population of 2951, of which 1547 are men and the female population comprises 1404.

Education 
Chhatrish Ganda village has lower literacy rate compared to West Bengal. In 2011, literacy rate of Chhatrish Ganda village was 66.97% compared to 76.26% of West Bengal. In Chhatrish Ganda Male literacy stands at 77.51% while female literacy rate was 55.73%.

Here are two Primary Schools one Bengali and one Hindi. There is two high schools also, one is Pandaveswar Sree Jaipuria High School which is situated in Kendra village is about 2 km east of Chhatrish Ganda and another is Nimsha Khottadih Alinagar High School which is situated in Khottadih village is about 4 km south of Chhatrish Ganda.

Transport 
There are two minibus routes serving Chhatrish Ganda - one Chhatrish Ganda to Raniganj via Pandaveswar and other from Chhatrish Ganda to Raniganj via Khottadih gram. Chhatrish Ganda is also connected to Pandaveswar through trekker services.

About 
Ever since the country's independence from the British rule in 1947, the economy of the nation has banked upon its agrarian society. A majority of the persons living in Chhatrish Ganda have involved themselves in agriculture and associated industries, and have thus made the country the quickest developing world economy. The Chhatrish Ganda is hope to people of different castes and creeds which rightly demonstrates the principles of 'Unity in Diversity'. Chhatrish Ganda village life is fully relied on agriculture and innate all over the land. The lifestyle maintained by the people of Chhatrish Ganda villages as well as their working styles are as fascinating as the balance offered by the metropolitan city lifestyles.

India is the country of villages; people of this nation majorly reside in the interior part of it that mainly comprises villages or rural human settlements, it is estimated that about 68.84% of the Indian population stays in villages. These human settlements are often large in area with Eco-friendly habitat contributing to the simple lifestyle led by the inhabitants.

References

External links

Villages in Paschim Bardhaman district